Adrien Poliquin (10 April 1929 – 14 June 2012) was a Canadian wrestler. He competed in the men's freestyle bantamweight at the 1952 Summer Olympics.

References

1929 births
2012 deaths
Canadian male sport wrestlers
Olympic wrestlers of Canada
Wrestlers at the 1952 Summer Olympics
People from Victoriaville
Sportspeople from Quebec
20th-century Canadian people